Untreue is a brook in Brilon, North Rhine-Westphalia, Germany. It disappears after about 2,700 meters east of Brilon at ca.  meters above NN through a ponor into limestone.

See also
List of rivers of North Rhine-Westphalia

Rivers of North Rhine-Westphalia
Untreue
Rivers of Germany